Jonathan Peter Taffer (born November 7, 1954) is an American entrepreneur and television personality. He is best known for hosting the reality series Bar Rescue on Paramount Network and Face the Truth on CBS with Vivica A. Fox. He is also largely credited with conceptualizing NFL Sunday Ticket.

Early life 
Taffer was born in Great Neck, New York on November 7, 1954, to Russian-Jewish parents. He graduated from William A. Shine Great Neck South High School in Great Neck in 1972 and, after a short time at the University of Denver studying political science and minoring in cultural anthropology, he relocated to Los Angeles.

Career 
Taffer was born into a family of entrepreneurs. He first worked as a bartender in 1973 for Barney's Beanery in West Hollywood while performing as a drummer in a band.

Taffer's first bar management job was at The Troubadour night club in West Hollywood in 1978. He was given full control of the bar in 1981 where staff theft was rife.  He opened his first bar as owner in 1989.

In 1989, Taffer patented an apparatus and method for selecting and playing music.

Taffer is credited with creating the NFL Sunday Ticket pay programming package, which was launched in 1994, and was instrumental in the marketing, distribution and sales programs of that endeavor, for which he served on the board of  NFL Enterprises for three years.

In 2010, he was appointed as president of the Nightclub and Bar Media Group, a division of Questex Media Group, which is responsible for Nightclub & Bar Magazine as well as the annual Nightclub & Bar Convention and Trade Show.

He was one of the first six inductees in the Nightclub Hall of Fame. On July 17, 2011, a reality television series, Bar Rescue, premiered on Spike TV (now the Paramount Network), that follows Taffer as he revitalizes failing bars and nightclubs across the United States. His wife Nicole occasionally appears on the show as a mystery shopper who assesses the quality of the bar before Taffer does the makeover.

In October 2013 New Harvest published Raise the Bar: An Action-Based Method for Maximum Customer Reactions, a book by Taffer and co-writer Karen Kelly, detailing the knowledge that Taffer acquired over the course of 40 years in the bar and nightlife business.

In November 2014, Taffer developed BarHQ, an all-inclusive bar and nightclub management app.

Taffer has a podcast called No Excuses, in which he interviews celebrity guests and discusses current events. New episodes premiere on Tuesdays on the PodcastOne network.

In 2018, Taffer became one of the hosts on CBS television series Face the Truth.

In May 2019, it was announced that Taffer would host a spinoff Paramount Network show called Marriage Rescue, where he would work to save couples' failing relationships. The spinoff series premiered on June 2, 2019. The series follows 12 couples as Taffer uses the Gestalt therapy to help them work through their issues.

Personal life 
Taffer lives in Las Vegas. He has been married to his wife Nicole, since 2000. Taffer also has a daughter named Samantha, from a previous marriage.

Political views 
In 2021, he agreed with Fox News host Laura Ingraham's comparison of Americans receiving temporary unemployment benefits due to the COVID-19 pandemic to dogs that must be kept hungry in order to elicit obedience. He later apologized, and it was revealed that his LLC accepted nearly $61,000 of government PPP loans during the pandemic.

When Donald Trump was elected as president in 2016, Jon Taffer praised Trump's economic policy, believing his tax cuts and deregulation would increase profits, benefit small businesses, and support restaurant industry employers and their employees. He is a critic of the rising minimum wage, believing it leads to increased automation and less hours worked, leading to less pay for American workers; he finds this to be especially true with the increasing amount of popular New York's restaurants. In 2019, he predicted technology could possibly replace restaurant workers in seven years due to the rising minimum wage.

References

External links
 
 

1954 births
American people of Russian-Jewish descent
American restaurateurs
American television hosts
American libertarians
Bar Rescue
Living people
Male television personalities
People from Great Neck, New York
University of Denver alumni
William A. Shine Great Neck South High School alumni